"We Should Be Sleeping" is a song by American rock singer Eddie Money, released as the fourth single from his album Can't Hold Back in 1986. It reached #90 on the Billboard Hot 100.

Context
The song follows the story behind Eddie Money and his band's lack of sleep because of extensive and exhausting touring. In the lyrics, Eddie Money uses several references towards staying awake, yet having no energy.

Uses in popular culture
It is heard in a 2013 TV commercial for Beautyrest.

Songs about sleep
Eddie Money songs
1987 singles
1986 songs
Columbia Records singles
Songs written by Eddie Money